Ceslaus, O.P., (c. 1184 – c. 1242) was born in Kamień Śląski in Silesia, Poland, of the noble family of Odrowąż, and was a relative, possibly the brother, of Hyacinth of Poland.

Biography
Having studied philosophy at Prague, he pursued his theological and juridical studies at the University of Bologna, after which he returned to Cracow, where he held the office of canon and custodian of the church of Sandomierz.

About 1218 he accompanied his uncle Ivo, Bishop of Cracow, to Rome. Hearing of the great sanctity of Dominic of Osma, who had recently been attributed the miracle of resuscitating the nephew of Cardinal Stefano di Fossa Nova who had been killed in a fall from his horse, Ceslaus, together with Hyacinth, sought admission into the Order of Friars Preachers.

In 1219 Pope Honorius III invited Dominic and his companions to take up residence at the ancient Roman basilica of Santa Sabina, which they did by early 1220. Hyacinth and Ceslaus along with their companions Herman and Henry were among the first to enter the studium of the Dominican Order at Rome out of which would grow the 16th-century College of Saint Thomas at Santa Maria sopra Minerva and the Pontifical University of Saint Thomas Aquinas, Angelicum in the 20th century.  After an abbreviated novitiate Ceslaus, Hyacinth and their companions received the religious habit of the Order from Dominic himself in 1220.

Their novitiate completed, Dominic sent the young friars back as missionaries to their own country. Establishing a friary at Friesach in Austria, they proceeded to Cracow whence Ceslaus was sent by Hyacinth to Prague, the metropolis of Bohemia.

Labouring with much fruit throughout the Diocese of Prague, Ceslaus went to Wrocław, where he founded a large priory, and then extended his missionary labours over a vast territory, embracing Bohemia, Poland, Pomerania, and Saxony.

Sometime after the death of Hyacinth he was chosen the Provincial Superior for Poland. Whilst he was superior of the convent of Wrocław all Poland was threatened by the Mongols. The city of Wrocław being besieged, the people sought the aid of Ceslaus, who by his prayers miraculously averted the impending calamity. Four persons are said to have been raised to life by him. He died at Wrocław. His tomb is located in the Church of St. Adalbert in Wrocław.

Having always been venerated as a blessed, his cult was finally confirmed by Pope Clement XI in 1713. His feast is celebrated throughout the Dominican Order on 16 July.

References

Notes

External links

"St. Ceslas, Confessor", Butler's Lives of the Saints
 Ceslaus at the Catholic Encyclopedia

1180s births
1240s deaths
Polish beatified people
Polish Dominicans
Odrowąż family
People from Silesia
13th-century Christian saints
13th-century Polish people
Beatifications by Pope Clement XI